Robert Lee Stewart (31 May 1903 – 19 September 1965) was an Australian rules footballer who played with Richmond in the Victorian Football League (VFL).

Notes

External links 

1903 births
1965 deaths
Australian rules footballers from Victoria (Australia)
Richmond Football Club players
Williamstown Football Club players